The Road to Ruin is an Australian melodrama film directed by W. J. Lincoln. It was one of the first movies from Lincoln-Cass Films and is considered a lost film.

Plot
Norman Harding, son of magnate Sir Gerald Harding, makes a fortune from stock speculation but borrows too much and faces ruin. His sister Elsie is in love with a bank clerk, Harold Henderson, who Norman persuades to help him in a bank fraud. Henderson becomes drawn into society life and finds himself greatly in debt but is bailed out by Sir Gerald.

Production
The film was shot in Melbourne and features many notable landmarks such as the Royal Botanical Gardens. The movie was supposedly based on fact. Scenes at Caulfield Raceway were taken on 6 September 1913 and included Meritus winning the Doona Trials.

Cast
Roy Redgrave
Godfrey Cass
George Bryant
Tom Cannan
Beryl Bryant
Marion Willis
Ward Lyons
Charles Wheeler
Marcus St John
John Brunton
Marion Willis

Reception
According to one review:
The Road to Ruin stands out as one of the most unique dramas of Melbourne life. It is founded on fact, and in the course of the story both interiors and exteriors of the city are included. It discloses some most beautiful scenic bits of Melbourne, including the Botanical Gardens, street scenes and important business houses and a magnificent series of race Sictures taken at Caulfield on Saturday, 6th inst., showing Meritus winning the Doona Trials.
It was the first Lincoln Cass film to be released in Sydney.

References

External links
The Road to Ruin at IMDb
The Road to Ruin at AustLit

Australian black-and-white films
Australian silent short films
Lost Australian films
1913 films
1913 drama films
Melodrama films
Australian drama films
1913 lost films
Lost drama films
Films directed by W. J. Lincoln
Silent drama films
1910s English-language films